Narcissus degeneration virus (NDV) is a plant pathogenic Potyvirus of the family Potyviridae which infects plants of the genus Narcissus. It is one of the most serious and prevalent of the approximately 21 viruses which infect this genus.NDV is associated with chlorotic leaf striping in N. tazetta.

References

Bibliography

External links
ICTVdB - The Universal Virus Database: Narcissus degeneration virus
Uniprot

Viral plant pathogens and diseases
Potyviruses